The British Rail Class 936 was reserved for former electrical multiple units not from the South-East, converted for departmental use. Units were converted for various tasks, including application of sandite, and de-icing duties.

Merseyrail Units

Scottish Units

References

Sources

936
British Rail Departmental Units
Rail transport in Merseyside
Train-related introductions in 1984
Train-related introductions in 1994